Abdu Zehi (also Romanized as ʿAbdū Zehī; also known as ‘Abdī Zā’ī, ‘Abdī Zehī, ‘Abdīzehī, ‘Abdozī, and ‘Abd Zehī) is a village in Polan Rural District, Polan District, Chabahar County, Sistan and Baluchestan Province, Iran. At the 2006 census, its population was 552, in 97 families.

References 

Populated places in Chabahar County